Rzeszotary-Pszczele  is a village in the administrative district of Gmina Rościszewo, within Sierpc County, Masovian Voivodeship, in east-central Poland.

The village has a population of 45.

References

Rzeszotary-Pszczele